Daniel Henderson (born 4 April 1991) is a speedway rider from Sweden.

Speedway career 
In 2021, he suffered serious injuries in a crash, which resulted in 12 broken ribs and a spine injury and was close to announcing his retirement. However he returned to speedway when riding for Rospiggarna in his native Sweden.

Henderson has reached every Swedish Individual Speedway Championship final from 2018 to 2022 and finished 5th in the 2020 Swedish Individual Speedway Championship.

In 2023, he signed for Vargarna in the Swedish Allsvenskan and will make his Polish debut in 2023 after signing for Polonia Piła.

References 

Living people
1991 births
Swedish speedway riders